is a town located in Miyagi Prefecture, Japan. , the town had an estimated population of 13,092, and a population density of 48 persons per km² in 5,050 households.

Geography
Marumori is located in the extreme southern portion of Miyagi Prefecture in the Tōhoku region of northern Japan, bordered by Fukushima Prefecture to the south, east and west. The name “Marumori” means "circle forest" in Japanese and the town is located in a circular basin surrounded by heavily forested mountains. The Abukuma River passes through the town.

Neighboring municipalities
Miyagi Prefecture
Kakuda
Shiroishi
Yamamoto
Fukushima Prefecture
Sōma
Date
Shinchi

Climate
Marumori has a humid climate (Köppen climate classification Cfa) characterized by mild summers and cold winters.

Demographics
Per Japanese census data, the population of Marumori has declined over the past 70 years.

History
The area of present-day Marumori was part of ancient Mutsu Province, and was part of the holdings of Sendai Domain under the Edo period Tokugawa shogunate. The village of Marumori was established on April 1, 1889 with the establishment of the post-Meiji restoration modern municipalities system.  It was raised to town status on December 1, 1954 after merging with the neighboring villages of Kaneyama, Ōuchi, Ōhari, Kōya, Kosai, Tateyama and Hippo.

Government
Marumori has a mayor-council form of government with a directly elected mayor and a unicameral town council of 14 members. Marumori, together with the city of Kakuda, contributes one seat to the Miyagi Prefectural legislature. In terms of national politics, the town is part of Miyagi 3rd district of the lower house of the Diet of Japan.

Economy
The economy of Marumori is largely based on agriculture and forestry.

Education
As of April 2022, Marumori has two public elementary schools and one public junior high school operated by the town government, and one public high school operated by the Miyagi Prefectural Board of Education. There is also one private elementary school.

Transportation

Railway
AbukumaExpress - Abukuma Express Line
 -  -

Highway

Sister city relations
 - Hemet, California, USA
 - Kitami, Hokkaido, Japan

References

External links

Official Website 

 
Towns in Miyagi Prefecture